Sebastian Hackl (born 4 October 1980 in Passau, Germany) is a German professional wrestler and commentator. His Ring name is Sebastian Sage.

Career 
At the age of nine, Hackl became interested in wrestling. He was contracted from 2009 to 2012 as a contract survivor at NEW. In GWP and  Westside Xtreme Wrestling (wXw), he appeared as a free agent.
On April 15, 2013, he announced the interim end of his in-ring career to focus on commenting.
Since 2010 Hackl's been under contract with WWE but competed in matches for WFW, New European Championship Wrestling and  Ultimate Kombat Wrestling Association. In December, 2010, he won the UKWA Champion title from Maxxberg on Maxima 8.
At the moment he is a member of the German announcer team and is heard on EuroSport, Sky, ProSieben Maxx and WWE Network. 
Besides all the above he commentates on MMA events on DAZN too.

Championships and accomplishments
 1x UKWA Champion
 1x NEW Hardcore Champion

References

1980 births
Living people
German male professional wrestlers